
Gmina Opatów is a rural gmina (administrative district) in Kłobuck County, Silesian Voivodeship, in southern Poland.

Villages
Gmina Opatów contains the villages and settlements of Brzezinki, Iwanowice Duże, Iwanowice Małe, Iwanowice-Naboków, Opatów, Waleńczów, Wilkowiecko, Złochowice, Zwierzyniec Drugi and Zwierzyniec Pierwszy.

Neighbouring gminas
Gmina Opatów is bordered by the gminas of Kłobuck, Krzepice, Lipie, Miedźno, Panki, Popów and Wręczyca Wielka.

References

Opatow
Kłobuck County